Pitanga may refer to:

Pitanga (album), an album by Mallu Magalhaes
Pitanga, Paraná, town in Brazil
Camila Pitanga, Brazilian actress
Eugenia uniflora, or pitanga, a plant in the family Myrtaceae, native to tropical America

See also
 Pitanga River (disambiguation)
 Pitango, an Israeli venture capital fund